Bałtyk Gdynia is a Polish football club from Gdynia. The club is named after the Baltic Sea.

History 
The club was established in 1930 by football enthusiasts from the developing city. Bałtyk is the oldest football club from Gdynia, which still plays with its original name.

Bałtyk played 7 seasons in the Polish first league and 19 in Polish second league. They also appeared once in the Intertoto Cup, in 1983. In 1977, Baltyk's U-19 team won bronze in the Polish Championship, and in 1982, Baltyk won silver in the U-19 championship of Poland.

In 2019 and 2020 the club fell victim to a career fraudster causing the club to sign player contracts promising money that did not exist. The perpetrator was never caught however the club managed to negotiate a recovery plan and by 2021 the club was solvent again.

Fans 
The fans are known as "Kadłuby" (The Hulls). Once one of the strongest fan groups in the 80's, as the team started to fall down the leagues only a handful of loyal supporters now remain in Gdynia and several smaller towns in the region.

In the past the fast used to have short-lived friendly relations with fans of Lech Poznań, Pogoń Lębork and Ferencváros at various points in their history. Currently they have good relations with fans of Kotwica Kołobrzeg and Cartusia Kartuzy.

The two Tricity derby rivals Lechia Gdańsk and Arka Gdynia are considered the most fierce. The games against Arka, also known as the Gdynia derby have a long history and the fans often contend for dominance in the city. The controversy surrounding the two club's stadium use is also a serious cause of tension between the two.

Due to Bałtyk languishing in the lower leagues for several years, the club has developed rivalries with other clubs, mainly Gryf Słupsk.

Bałtyk in Europe

Current squad

Former players

  Lawrence Papaleo

References

External links 
 Official website
 Unofficial website

Association football clubs established in 1930
1930 establishments in Poland
Sport in Gdynia
Football clubs in Pomeranian Voivodeship